Flying Officer Eugene Quimby "Red" Tobin (4 January 1917 – 7 September 1941) was an American pilot who flew with the Royal Air Force during the Battle of Britain in World War II. He was one of 11 American pilots who flew with RAF Fighter Command between 10 July and 31 October 1940, thereby qualifying for the Battle of Britain clasp to the 1939–45 campaign star.

Early life
Born in Salt Lake City, Utah, but raised from early childhood in Los Angeles, California, the son of Ignatius Quimby Tobin and Mary Alicia Tobin (née O'Fallon). Tobin initially came to Europe to fight on the side of Finland against the Soviet Union's invasion of that country, but hostilities had ceased before he arrived. He was already a qualified pilot, having learned to fly in the 1930s.

Tobin and Andrew Mamedoff had been flying friends at Mines Field in California before the war.

Second World War
Tobin and his friends and fellow Americans Andrew Mamedoff and Vernon Keogh were among 32 pilots recruited by American soldier of fortune Charles Sweeny to join the French Air Force. However, by the time they reached France, Germany had already invaded the country. The trio made their way to England and joined the Royal Air Force in 1940. (Of the rest of Sweeny's recruits, four were killed, 11 were taken prisoner, and two others reached England.)

On 8 August 1940 Tobin was posted to No. 609 Squadron RAF at Middle Wallop airfield. He flew his first mission on 16 August 1940. He flew many missions during the height of the Battle of Britain in August and September. He was credited with two shared kills – a Bf 110 on 25 August and a Do 17 on 15 September.

He was posted to RAF Kirton in Lindsey in Lincolnshire on 18 September 1940 and was a founding member of the No. 71 'Eagle' Squadron along with Art Donahue, Andrew Mamedoff and Vernon Keogh.

After arriving in Britain Tobin had been diagnosed with lupus which at the time was a fatal disease, but kept his illness a secret so he could continue to fly for the RAF.

Death
On 7 September 1941, Tobin was killed in combat with Bf 109's of JG 26 on 71 Squadron's first sweep over northern France, one of three Spitfires shot down. He crashed into a hillside near Boulogne-sur-Mer and was buried in Boulogne Eastern Cemetery, France. He was 24 years old.

See also

Eagle Squadrons
List of RAF aircrew in the Battle of Britain
Non-British personnel in the RAF during the Battle of Britain

References
 Klaus Ulrich Spiegel: "Quel canto mi conquide" - Stuttgart Spinto in his Era - HAfG Disc Edition - Hamburger Archiv

1917 births
1941 deaths
American expatriates in France
American expatriates in the United Kingdom
American Royal Air Force pilots of World War II
Aviators killed by being shot down
Royal Air Force personnel killed in World War II
French Air and Space Force personnel
People from Los Angeles
The Few
People with lupus
French military personnel of World War II